Synageles is a genus of jumping spiders that was first described by Eugène Louis Simon in 1876.

Species

 it contains nineteen species, found in the Old World from Spain to China, with one found in northern Africa (S. repudiatus from Egypt), and in the New World from Mexico to Canada, and the Bahamas:
Synageles albotrimaculatus (Lucas, 1846) – Spain, France, Italy, Algeria, Tunisia, Turkey
Synageles bishopi Cutler, 1988 – USA
Synageles canadensis Cutler, 1988 – USA, Canada
Synageles charitonovi Andreeva, 1976 – Kazakhstan, Central Asia
Synageles dalmaticus (Keyserling, 1863) – Mediterranean, Bulgaria, Romania, Ukraine, Caucasus (Russia, Azerbaijan)
Synageles hilarulus (C. L. Koch, 1846) – Europe, Turkey, Russia (Europe to Far East), Kazakhstan, Central Asia, Korea, Japan
Synageles idahoanus (Gertsch, 1934) – USA
Synageles leechi Cutler, 1988 – Canada
Synageles mexicanus Cutler, 1988 – USA, Mexico
Synageles morsei Logunov & Marusik, 1999 – Russia (Far East)
Synageles nigriculus Danilov, 1997 – Russia (South Siberia, Far East)
Synageles noxiosus (Hentz, 1850) – North America, Bahama Is.
Synageles occidentalis Cutler, 1988 – USA, Canada
Synageles persianus Logunov, 2004 – Armenia, Azerbaijan, Iran
Synageles ramitus Andreeva, 1976 – Ukraine, Russia (Europe to South Siberia), Kazakhstan, Central Asia, Mongolia, China
Synageles repudiatus (O. Pickard-Cambridge, 1876) – Egypt
Synageles scutiger Prószyński, 1979 – Greece, Ukraine, Azerbaijan
Synageles subcingulatus (Simon, 1878) – Central Europe, Ukraine, Russia (Europe, West Siberia), Turkey, Azerbaijan, Kazakhstan, Central Asia
Synageles venator (Lucas, 1836) (type) – Europe, Turkey, Caucasus, Russia (Europe to Far East), Kazakhstan, Central Asia, China, Japan. Introduced to Canada

References

External links
 Photograph of S. venator
 Photograph of female S. venator

Further reading

Salticidae genera
Salticidae
Spiders of Asia
Spiders of North America